Struggle sessions or denunciation rallies were violent public spectacles in Maoist China where people accused of being "class enemies" were publicly humiliated, accused, beaten and tortured by people with whom they were close. Usually conducted at the workplace, classrooms and auditoriums, "students were pitted against their teachers, friends and spouses were pressured to betray one another, [and] children were manipulated into exposing their parents". Staging, scripts and agitators were prearranged by the Maoists to incite crowd support. The aim was to instill a crusading spirit among the crowd to promote the Maoist thought reform. These rallies were most popular in the mass campaigns immediately before and after the establishment of the People's Republic of China and during the Cultural Revolution.

The denunciation of prominent class enemies was often conducted in public squares and marked by large crowds of people who surrounded the kneeling victim, raised their fists, and shouted accusations of misdeeds.

History

Etymology

According to Lin Yutang, the expression comes from pīpàn ('to criticize and judge') and dòuzhēng ('to fight and contest'), so the whole expression conveys the message of "inciting the spirit of judgment and fighting." Instead of saying the full phrase pīpàn dòuzhēng, it was shortened to pīdòu.

The term refers to class struggle; the session is held, ostensibly, to benefit the target, by eliminating all traces of counterrevolutionary, reactionary thinking.

Origins and "speak bitterness" sessions 
Struggle sessions developed from similar ideas of criticism and self-criticism in the Soviet Union from the 1920s. Chinese communists resisted this at first, as struggle sessions conflicted with the Chinese concept of 'saving face'. However, these sessions became commonplace at Chinese Communist Party (CCP) meetings during the 1930s due to public popularity.

Struggle sessions emerged in China as a tactic to secure the allegiance of the Chinese people during the land reform (tǔdì gǎigé) campaign. That campaign sought to mobilize the masses through intensive propaganda followed by "speak bitterness" sessions (sùkǔ, "give utterance to grief") in which peasants were encouraged to accuse land owners.

Development and disuse 
The strongest accusations in the Speak Bitterness sessions were incorporated into scripted and stage-managed public mass accusation meetings (kòngsù dàhuì). Cadres then cemented the peasants’ loyalty by inducing them to actively participate in violent acts against landowners. Later struggle sessions were adapted to use outside the CCP as a means of consolidating its control of areas under its jurisdiction.

Struggle sessions were disowned in China after 1978, when the reformers led by Deng Xiaoping took power. Starting from the "Boluan Fanzheng" period, Deng prohibited struggle sessions and other kinds of Mao-era violent political campaigns.

Purpose 
Frederick T. C. Yu identified three categories of mass campaigns employed by the CCP in the years before and after the establishment of the People's Republic of China (PRC):

 Economic campaigns sought to improve conditions, often by increasing production in particular sectors of the economy.
 Ideological campaigns sought to change people's thinking and behaviour.
 Struggle sessions were similar to ideological campaigns, but "their focus is on the elimination of the power base and/or class position of enemy classes or groups."

The process of struggle sessions served multiple purposes. First, it demonstrated to the masses that the party was determined to subdue any opposition (generally labeled “class enemies”), by violence if necessary. Second, potential rivals were crushed. Third, those who attacked the targeted foes became complicit in the violence and hence invested in the state. All three served to consolidate the party's control, which was deemed necessary because party members constituted a small minority of China's population.
 
Both accusation meetings and mass trials were largely propaganda tools to accomplish the party's aims. Klaus Mühlhahn, professor of China studies at Freie Universität Berlin, wrote:

Julia C. Strauss observed that public tribunals were "but the visible dénouement of a show that had been many weeks in preparation".

Accounts
Margaret Chu, writing retrospectively for the Cardinal Mindszenty Foundation's Mindszenty Report in November 1998, said:

Anne F. Thurston, in Enemies of the People, gave a description of a struggle session for the professor You Xiaoli: "I had many feelings at that struggle session. I thought there were some bad people in the audience. But I also thought there were many ignorant people, people who did not understand what was happening, so I pitied that kind of person. They brought workers and peasants into the meetings, and they could not understand what was happening. But I was also angry."

The Canadian journalist Jan Wong recalled her experience as an exchange student in the 1960s: "It wasn't a 批判大会 pipan dahui [struggle session]. It was a 批评会 piping hui [criticism session]", drawing a crucial Maoist distinction. Then, "Fu the Enforcer and Cadre Huang had frequently subjected Erica and me to criticism sessions. It was like being summoned to the principal's office in high school—not pleasant, but not devastating either. A struggle session, on the other hand, was brutal and vicious. I was relieved to hear that it had been merely a criticism session."

See also 

 Anti-Bolshevik League incident
 Campaign to Suppress Counterrevolutionaries
 Class warfare
 Futian incident
 Kangaroo court
 New People's Army
 Presumption of guilt
 Self-criticism (Marxism–Leninism)
 Show trial
 Two Minutes Hate, from Orwell's Nineteen Eighty-Four
 United Red Army

References

Campaigns of the Chinese Communist Party
Cultural Revolution
Group processes
Maoist China
Maoist terminology
Meetings
Political repression in China
Abuse of the legal system
Vigilantism
Crowd psychology
Torture in China
Mass psychogenic illness